

Crown
Head of state (monarch) – Queen Victoria of the United Kingdom

Federal government
Governor General - The Viscount Monck

Cabinet
Prime Minister - Sir John A. Macdonald
Minister of Agriculture - Jean-Charles Chapais (from July 1)
Minister of Finance 
 Alexander Galt (July 1-November 7)
 Vacant (November 7-November 18)
 Sir John Rose (from November 18)
Minister of Justice - John A. Macdonald (from July 1)
President of the Queen's Privy Council for Canada - Adam Johnston Fergusson Blair (from July 1)
Minister of Public Works - William McDougall (from July 1)
Postmaster General - Alexander Campbell (from July 1)
Secretary of State for Canada - Hector Louis Langevin (from July 1)
Minister of Marine and Fisheries - Peter Mitchell (from July 1)

Members of Parliament
See: 1st Canadian parliament, then 2nd Canadian parliament

Opposition leaders
Liberal Party of Canada - George Brown
Anti-Confederate - Joseph Howe

Other
Speaker of the House of Commons - James Cockburn

Provinces

Premiers
Premier of New Brunswick - Andrew R. Wetmore
Premier of Nova Scotia - Charles Tupper
Premier of Ontario - John Sandfield Macdonald
Premier of Quebec - Pierre-Joseph-Olivier Chauveau

Lieutenant governors

Lieutenant-Governor of New Brunswick - Francis Pym Harding
Lieutenant-Governor of Nova Scotia - Sir Charles Hastings Doyle
Lieutenant-Governor of Ontario - Henry William Stisted
Lieutenant-Governor of Quebec - Narcisse-Fortunat Belleau

See also
 1867 in Canada
 Canadian incumbents by year

1867
Incumbents
Candian incumbents